Pnigodes is a genus of true weevils in the beetle family Curculionidae. There is at least one described species in Pnigodes, P. setosus.

References

Further reading

 
 
 

Curculionidae
Articles created by Qbugbot